The Dena Tape is the debut mixtape by American rapper Hodgy Beats. It was self-released on July 7, 2009. It is also the first solo project from any Odd Future member, with its only predecessor being The Odd Future Tape. It stood as the only solo project from Hodgy Beats until three years later, when he released Untitled in early 2012.

Reception 
The Dena Tape is considered to be the weakest project from any Odd Future member, from critics and fans alike. Pitchfork wrote on the mixtape, stating

Hodgy's debut mixtape features almost no guest verses, and Hodgy just wasn't far along enough as a rapper to warrant an hour-long album to himself. Hodgy's far from the crew's most charismatic rapper, and his sleepy behind-the-beat delivery works best when it's used as a foil to Tyler's manic ferocity. The Dena Tape is just as much mixtape as album, with Hodgy rapping over tracks like Jamie Foxx's "Blame It" and Jay-Z's "Ignorant Shit" along with all the drunken-synth Odd Future tracks you'd expect. But Hodgy raps here like someone who doesn't even remotely care about rapping. He wouldn't hit his stride until he linked up with non-rapping producer Left Brain to form MellowHype, where Hodgy's lazy delivery becomes a part of Left Brain's sonic universe. MellowHype's debut album YelloWhite would come not long after The Dena Tape, and there's a world of progress in between the two releases. As it is, The Dena Tape stands as maybe the single biggest outright dud in the Odd Future catalog.

Track listing

References 

2010 mixtape albums
Albums produced by Left Brain
Albums produced by Tyler, the Creator